Kingunge Ngombale–Mwiru (30 May 1930 – 2 February 2018) was a veteran Tanzanian politician, who died on 2 February 2018.

Kingunge was regarded as one of the comrades who endured sacrifices for the independence of Tanganyika (Tanzania Mainland), The United Republic of Tanzania.

Kingunge was an active member and a leader in the Tanganyika African National Union (Tanu), the political party which fought and gained independence of Tanganyika on December 9, 1961, also Kingunge was among the key figures on the process of joining Tanu and Afro Shiraz Party (ASP) of Zanzibar to found Chama Cha Mapinduzi (CCM) on February 5, 1977.

Ideologically, Kingunge was a communist with passion and remained true on that ideology until his death. Kingunge was a Marxian (Marxian Class Theory), and the results of that he did not believe in religion, although he respected all religions.

Kingunge rendered a long-term service in the Tanzania Government and Tanu before CCM, and one of the symbols of Kingunge is his model of taking an oath without holding on any of Holy Books, neither Bible nor Quran. Regularly, Kingunge took an oath by using Tanzania Constitution for all positions of government he served.

[1]

Political career
After several years as the head of the CCM, Ngombale–Mwiru abruptly left the party in 2015.

References

1930 births
2018 deaths
Chama Cha Mapinduzi politicians
Tanzanian atheists
Tanzanian Roman Catholics
Government ministers of Tanzania